On April 3, 1974, a destructive tornado struck the city of Xenia and town of Wilberforce, Ohio, killing 36 people. The tornado stands as the deadliest individual tornado of the 1974 Super Outbreak. The tornado destroyed a large portion of Xenia, which caused meteorologist Dr. Ted Fujita to initially assign a preliminary rating of F6 intensity ± 1 on the Fujita scale, making it one of only two tornadoes to receive the rating, the other being the 1970 Lubbock tornado that occurred four years earlier. This was later downgraded to F5 after Fujita deeming F6 ratings "inconceivable".

Meteorological synopsis

A powerful springtime low pressure system developed across the North American Interior Plains on April 1. While moving into the Mississippi and Ohio Valley areas, a surge of unusually moist air intensified the storm further, while there were sharp temperature contrasts between both sides of the system. Officials at NOAA and in the National Weather Service forecast offices were expecting a severe weather outbreak on April 3, but not to the extent that ultimately occurred. Several F2 and F3 tornadoes had struck portions of the Ohio Valley and the South in a separate, earlier outbreak on April 1 and 2, which included three killer tornadoes in Kentucky, Alabama, and Tennessee. The town of Campbellsburg, northeast of Louisville, was hard-hit in this earlier outbreak, with a large portion of the town destroyed by an F3. Between the two outbreaks, an additional tornado was reported in Indiana in the early morning hours of April 3, several hours before the official start of the outbreak. On Wednesday, April 3, severe weather watches already were issued from the morning from south of the Great Lakes, while in portions of the Upper Midwest, snow was reported, with heavy rain falling across central Michigan and much of Ontario.

Tornado summary
The tornado formed near Bellbrook, Ohio, southwest of Xenia, at about 4:30 pm EDT. It began as a moderate-sized tornado, then intensified while moving northeast at about 50 mph (80 km/h). The tornado exhibited a multiple-vortex structure, which was described as a "pair of funnels coming together". and became very large as it approached town. Gil Whitney, the weather specialist for WHIO-TV in Dayton, alerted viewers in Montgomery and Greene Counties (where Xenia is located) about the possible tornado, broadcasting the radar image of the supercell with a pronounced hook echo on the rear flank of the storm several minutes before it actually struck. The storm was visible on radar because of raindrops wrapping around the circulation.
The massive tornado slammed into the western part of Xenia, completely flattening the Windsor Park and Arrowhead subdivisions at F5 intensity, and sweeping away entire rows of brick homes with little debris left behind in some areas. Extensive wind-rowing of debris occurred in nearby fields.

When the storm reached central Xenia at 4:40 pm, apartment buildings, homes, businesses, churches, and schools including Xenia High School were destroyed. At this time, the tornado was videotaped and was observed to have "as many as five subvortices merging into one" tornado. Students in the school, practicing for a play, took cover in the main hallway seconds before the tornado dropped a school bus onto the stage where they had been practicing and extensively damaged the school building. Several railroad cars were lifted and blown over as the tornado passed over a moving Penn Central freight train in the center of town. It toppled headstones in Cherry Grove Cemetery, then moved through the length of the downtown business district, passing west of the courthouse (which sustained some exterior damage). Numerous businesses in downtown Xenia were heavily damaged or destroyed, and several people were killed at the A&W Root Beer stand as the building was flattened. At the time, this was the state's highest tornadic death toll for a single building since 1953. Past downtown, the tornado continued into the Pinecrest Garden district, which was extensively affected.

The Xenia tornado was recorded on film by one resident, and its sound was recorded on tape by a Mr. Brokeshoulder from inside an apartment complex. Before the tornado hit the building, the resident left the tape recorder on, and it was found after the storm. At the same time a few blocks away, 16-year-old Xenia resident Bruce Boyd captured 3 minutes and 21 seconds of footage with a "Super-8" 8mm movie camera, a pre-1973 model without sound recording capability. The footage was later paired with the nearby tape recording. Boyd's film shows multiple vortices within the larger circulation as the storm swept through Xenia. Upon exiting Xenia, the tornado passed through Wilberforce, heavily damaging several campus and residential buildings of Wilberforce University. Central State University also sustained considerable damage, and a water tower there was toppled. Its maximum width was a half-mile (0.8 km) in Xenia. The same parent storm later spawned a weaker tornado northeast of Columbus in Franklin County.

A total of 32 people lost their lives in the tornado, and about 1,150 were injured in Xenia, several of whom took proper shelter. In addition to the direct fatalities, two Ohio Air National Guardsmen deployed for disaster assistance were killed on April 17 when a fire swept through their temporary barracks in a furniture store. The memorial in downtown Xenia lists 34 deaths, in honor of the two Guardsmen. About 1,400 buildings (roughly half of the town) were heavily damaged or destroyed. Damage was estimated at US$100 million ($471.7 million in 2013 dollars).

Aftermath

President Richard Nixon made an unannounced visit to Xenia a few days later. It would be the first (and only) city affected by the 1974 Super Outbreak that he would visit. Upon inspecting the damage, he said: "As I look back over the disasters, I saw the earthquake in Anchorage in 1964; I saw the hurricanes... Hurricane Camille in 1969 down in Mississippi, and I saw Hurricane Agnes in Wilkes-Barre, Pennsylvania. And it is hard to tell the difference among them all, but I would say in terms of destruction, just total devastation, this is the worst I have seen." President Nixon immediately declared Xenia a disaster area. Although the Federal Disaster Relief Act was already introduced in 1973, it still had not passed Congress. The 1974 Super Outbreak disaster was a catalyst for accelerated passage of the act through Congress in 1974, according to Nixon. It took several months for the city to recover from the tornado, with the help of the Red Cross and the Ohio National Guard assisting the recovery efforts. Most of the town was quickly re-built afterward. In recognition of their coverage of the tornado under difficult circumstances, the staff of the Xenia Daily Gazette won the Pulitzer Prize for Spot News Reporting in 1975. The Xenia tornado was one of two rated F5 that affected Ohio during the outbreak, the other striking the Cincinnati area (see Cincinnati/Sayler Park area tornado).  Xenia was later struck by two other tornadoes—both a smaller one in April 1989 and a larger one in September 2000, which was an F4 tornado that killed one and injured about 100 in an area parallel to and just north of the 1974 path. Before the 1974 storm, the city had no tornado sirens. After the F5 tornado hit on April 3, 1974, ten sirens were installed across the area.

Preliminary F6 rating
Dr. Ted Fujita and a team of colleagues from the University of Chicago, University of Oklahoma, and National Severe Storms Laboratory, undertook a 10-month study of the 1974 Super Outbreak. Along with discovering much about tornadoes which was not known before, such as the downburst and the microburst, and assessing damage to surrounding structures, the Xenia tornado was determined to be the worst of the 148 storms. Fujita initially assigned a preliminary rating of F6 intensity ± 1 scale, before deeming F6 ratings "inconceivable".

See also
 List of F5 and EF5 tornadoes
 Tornadoes of 1974

References

F5 tornadoes
Tornadoes of 1974